Nationality words link to articles with information on the nation's poetry or literature (for instance, Irish or France).

Events

Works published
 Stephen Bateman, The Travayled Pylgrime, translated from Olivier de la Marche's Le chevalier delibere
 Alonso de Ercilla, La Araucana, an epic poem about the conquest of Chile; the first part was published this year, the second in 1578, when it was published with the first part; the third part was published with the first and second parts in 1589' Spain
 Barnabe Googe, The Ship of Safeguard
 Jan van der Noot, A theatre for Worldlings, including poems translated into English by Edmund Spenser from French sources, published by Henry Bynneman in London
 Thomas Underdowne, published anonymously, a translation from Latin, Ovid his Invective against Ibis

Births
Death years link to the corresponding "[year] in poetry" article:
 April 16 – Sir John Davies (died 1626), English poet and lawyer, attorney general in Ireland; not to be confused with his contemporary, John Davies of Hereford (c. 1565–1618)
 September 5 – Georg Friedrich of Hohenlohe-Neuenstein-Weikersheim (died 1645), German officer and amateur poet
 October 18 – Giambattista Marino (died 1625), Italian poet famous for his long epic L'Adone
 Also:
 Ján Bocatius (died 1621), Slovak
 Barnabe Barnes birth year uncertain, possibly 1568 or 1571 (when baptised) (died 1609), English
 Arthur Gorges (died 1625), English poet, translator and courtier
 Geoffrey Keating (Seathrún Céitinn) (died 1644), Irish Roman Catholic priest, poet and historian
 Emilia Lanier, also spelled "Aemilia Lanyer" (died 1645), English
 Thomas Seget (died 1627), Scottish poet writing in Latin
 Zhu Wuxia, flourished this year, Chinese woman poet

Deaths
Birth years link to the corresponding "[year] in poetry" article:
 September 5 – Bernardo Tasso (born 1493), Italian
 Between September 8 and October 5 – Mikołaj Rej (born 1505), Polish
 September 11 – Vincenza Armani (born c. 1530), Italian
 October 7 – Guillaume Guéroult (born c. 1507), French editor, translator and poet
 November 29 – António Ferreira (born 1528), Portuguese
 date not known – Huang O (born 1498), Chinese poet, a woman

See also

 Poetry
 16th century in poetry
 16th century in literature
 Dutch Renaissance and Golden Age literature
 Elizabethan literature
 French Renaissance literature
 Renaissance literature
 Spanish Renaissance literature

Notes

16th-century poetry
Poetry